Jane Stewart may refer to:

Jane Stewart (politician) (born 1955), former Canadian politician
Jane Stewart (scientist), English neuroscientist
Jane Stewart (executive) (1917–1990), American public relations executive
Jane Stewart, Countess of Galloway, Scottish countess

See also
Jane Stuart, American painter